Joseph Alexandre Camille Madore (August 3, 1858 – November 3, 1906) was a Canadian politician.

Born in Blue Bonnet's, Canada East, Madore was educated at the Montreal College, St. Mary's College and at McGill University, where he graduated a
B.C.L. in 1880. In 1881 he was called to the Quebec Bar. He was elected to the House of Commons of Canada for Hochelaga in the 1896 federal election. A Liberal, he was re-elected in 1900. In 1903, he was appointed Puisne Judge of the Supreme Court of Quebec.

References
 
 Personnel of the Senate and House of Commons, eighth Parliament of Canada, elected June 23, 1896

1858 births
1906 deaths
Liberal Party of Canada MPs
Members of the House of Commons of Canada from Quebec

McGill University Faculty of Law alumni